Jordan Deangelo Davis (born June 6, 1997) is an American-Azerbaijani basketball player for Hamburg Towers of the German Basketball Bundesliga. He played college basketball for the University of Northern Colorado, where in 2019 he was named the Big Sky Conference Player of the Year.

College career

Davis came to Northern Colorado after originally committing to Eastern Washington out of Canyon Springs High School in the Las Vegas Valley. Davis became a starter in his first season, averaging 11 points, 3.6 rebounds and 2.1 assists per game for the Bears. Over the next two seasons, Davis claimed third-team All-Big Sky Conference honors. In his junior season, the Bears won the 2018 CollegeInsider.com Postseason Tournament. After the season, Davis declared for the 2018 NBA draft without an agent, but ultimately decided to return for his senior season at Northern Colorado.

In Davis' senior season, he achieved several milestones. He passed the 2,000 career point mark in a win over Southern Utah in which he also scored a career-high 36 points. Later that season, he became the Bears' all-time leading scorer, passing Mike Higgins' mark of 2,112 points in a February 16, 2019 loss to Eastern Washington. On the season, Davis averaged 23.4 points, 4.7 rebounds and 4.7 assists and finished his career with 2,270 career points. At the close of the season, Davis was named first-team All-Big Sky and the Big Sky Player of the Year.

Professional career
After going undrafted in the 2019 NBA draft, Davis joined the Denver Nuggets for the 2019 NBA Summer League. On July 15, 2019, Davis signed with Baxi Manresa.

On November 20, 2019, he has signed with Rasta Vechta of the Basketball Bundesliga. He averaged 11.2 points and 2.4 assists in the Bundesliga. On May 18, 2019, Davis signed with Hapoel Tel Aviv of the Israeli Premier League.

On July 24, 2020, he has signed with UCAM Murcia of the Liga ACB. Davis signed a three-year extension with the team on December 15.

On February 16, 2023, he signed with Hamburg Towers of the German Basketball Bundesliga.

International career
In 2017, Davis was approached by officials from the Azerbaijan national basketball team to fill a need for a combo guard spot on their 2017 FIBA U20 European Championship team. Davis obtained an Azerbaijani passport and joined the team for the tournament. He averaged 26.8 points and 10.3 rebounds per game in Division B play, but the team did not advance to the championship round.

References

External links
Northern Colorado Bears bio
FIBA profile
College stats @ sports-reference.com

1997 births
Living people
American emigrants to Azerbaijan
American expatriate basketball people in Spain
American men's basketball players
Azerbaijani men's basketball players
Azerbaijani people of African-American descent
Basketball players from Nevada
Bàsquet Manresa players
CB Murcia players
Liga ACB players
Naturalized citizens of Azerbaijan
Northern Colorado Bears men's basketball players
People from North Las Vegas, Nevada
Point guards
Shooting guards
Sportspeople from Las Vegas